The Violin Concerto by the American composer John Adams was written in 1993. Its premiere was on January 19, 1994, by Jorja Fleezanis with the Minnesota Orchestra, conducted by Edo de Waart, at the Ordway Music Theater, Saint Paul, Minnesota.

The piece was co-commissioned by the New York City Ballet, leading to a strong sense of rhythm throughout the entire work. For it, Adams received the University of Louisville Grawemeyer Award for Music Composition.

A typical performance lasts around 35 minutes.

The Violin Concerto has been described as "the most original approach to the genre since the Alban Berg Concerto".

Structure
The work is in three movements:

It is dedicated to the memory of David Huntley of Boosey & Hawkes.

Instrumentation 
The work calls for solo violin accompanied by an orchestra with the following instrumentation.

Woodwinds
 2  flutes (both doubling piccolos)
 2 oboes (2nd doubling cor anglais)
 2 clarinets (2nd doubling bass clarinet)
 2 bassoons

Brass
 2 horns in F
 trumpet in C

Percussion
 2 players, doubling on
 timpani
 guiro
 3 bongo drums
 2 conga drums
 bass drum
 suspended cymbal
 tambourine
 claves
 high cowbell
 vibraphone
 marimba
 tubular bells

Keyboards
 2 synthesizers

Strings
 violin I (minimum 6)
 violin II (minimum 6)
 violas (minimum 5)
 cellos (minimum 5)
 double basses (minimum 2)

Recordings 

The first recording was with the London Symphony Orchestra, featuring soloist Gidon Kremer, and conducted by Kent Nagano, released as Nonesuch 79360–2.

In 2017 Orchid Classics released a recording (coupled with the  Korngold violin concerto), with soloist Ilya Gringolts and the Copenhagen Philharmonic conducted by Santtu-Matias Rouvali, reference ORC100066.

References

External links
 John Adams on his Violin Concerto Interview from Perspectives of New Music
 
 Violin Concerto Tech Specs by Mark Grey, sound designer for John Adams

Concertos by John Adams (composer)
Adams, John
1993 compositions